Belur is a village in Vellarikundu taluk of Kasaragod district in Kerala, India.

Administration
Belur village is administered by Kodom-Belur Panchayat under Kanhangad Block Panchayat. Belur is part of Kanhangad Assembly constituency under Kasaragod Loksabha constituency.

Demographics
As of 2011 Census, Belur village had population of 12,181 of which 5,837 are males and 6,344 are females. The sex ratio of Belur was 1,087 higher than state average of 1,084. The population of children below 6 years was 10.46%. Belur had overall literacy of 84.6% lower than state average of 94%. The male literacy stands at 89.9% and female literacy at 79.8%.

References

Kanhangad area
Villages in Kasaragod district